Albaredo may refer to:
 Albaredo Arnaboldi, municipality in the Province of Pavia in the Italian region Lombardy
 Albaredo d'Adige, municipality in the Province of Verona in the Italian region Veneto
 Albaredo per San Marco, municipality in the Province of Sondrio in the Italian region Lombardy